"On Cooperation" is one of the last works of Vladimir Lenin. It was written on January 6, 1923. First published in the "Way of Truth" newspaper, in issues 115 and 116, on May 26 and 27, 1923.

When working on the article, Vladimir Lenin used a number of books on cooperation.

Main ideas
In this article, Lenin emphasizes the great importance of cooperation in a multistructure economy in the country with a predominance of peasant population. He points out that cooperation allows to achieve:

Lenin believed that cooperation would allow the peasantry to transition to socialism in a simpler and easier way.

It is emphasized that in a mixed economy under the dictatorship of the proletariat, cooperative enterprises mean an important step from private capitalist enterprises to socialist ones. To develop cooperation, it is proposed to provide cooperative enterprises with various benefits, as well as to raise the cultural level of the peasantry in every way. The Leninist concept of a mixed economy is formulated:

Lenin's ideas about the cooperation of the peasantry formed the basis of the resolution of the 13th Congress of the Russian Communist Party (Bolsheviks) "On Cooperation" and "On Work in the Village".

Estimates
Alexander Yakovlev notes that in this article, a different point of view was expressed from the views of Karl Marx and Friedrich Engels on the way of combining personal interest with the public, since Karl Marx and Friedrich Engels were opposed to the ideas of the old cooperators (Fourier, Considerant, Saint-Simon).

Roy Medvedev notes that the Leninist principles of voluntariness and gradualism in the co-operation of the peasantry were grossly violated by Joseph Stalin during collectivization, which caused enormous economic and moral damage.

References

Sources

Further reading
 The Cooperative Plan of Vladimir Lenin / Antonov // Konda – Kun – Moscow: Soviet Encyclopedia, 1973 – (Great Soviet Encyclopedia: [in 30 volumes] / editor-in-chief Alexander Prokhorov; 1969–1978, volume 13).
 
 Vladimir Lenin. On Cooperation // Complete Works, Volume 45, Pages 370–371

External links
 Transcription at the Marxists Internet Archive

1923 works
Newspaper articles
Works by Vladimir Lenin
Political economy
Cooperatives